Ryan P. Cullins is a Canadian Progressive Conservative politician who has represented Fredericton-York in the Legislative Assembly of New Brunswick since 2020.

Political career 
Cullins defeated Rick DeSaulniers of the People's Alliance of New Brunswick.

References 

Living people
Politicians from Fredericton
Progressive Conservative Party of New Brunswick MLAs
21st-century Canadian politicians
Year of birth missing (living people)